Arthur Ellis Gelber,  (June 22, 1915 – January 1, 1998) was a Canadian philanthropist.

Educated at Upper Canada College, from 1977 to 1980, he was Chair of the Board of Trustees of the National Arts Centre.

In 1989, he established the Lionel Gelber Prize in honour of his brother.

In 1972, he was made an Officer of the Order of Canada and was promoted to Companion in 1994. In 1995, he was awarded the Ramon John Hnatyshyn Award for Voluntarism in the Performing Arts.

He was married to Esther Salomon. They had four daughters: Nancy, Patricia, Judith, and Sara.

References
 

1915 births
1998 deaths
Companions of the Order of Canada
Jewish Canadian philanthropists
People from Toronto
Upper Canada College alumni
20th-century philanthropists